KUED (channel 7), branded on-air as PBS Utah, is a PBS member television station in Salt Lake City, Utah, United States. The station is owned by the University of Utah, and has studios at the Eccles Broadcast Center on Wasatch Drive in the northeastern section of Salt Lake City; its transmitter is located on Farnsworth Peak in the Oquirrh Mountains, southwest of Salt Lake City. KUED has a large network of broadcast translators that extend its over-the-air coverage throughout Utah.

Prior to July 2018, KUED was one of two PBS member stations serving Utah, the other being Provo-licensed KBYU-TV (channel 11), owned by Brigham Young University. In October 2017, it was announced that KBYU would drop PBS programming on June 30, 2018 in favor of its own BYUtv service, leaving KUED as the sole PBS station for the state.

History

The station first signed on the air on January 20, 1958, with an episode of The Friendly Giant. The station originally broadcast from improvised studios set up in the basement of the old student union building on the University of Utah campus. The station had humble beginnings with no props, primitive equipment, and a donated transmitter, courtesy of Time-Life Inc., then-owners of KTVT (channel 4, now KTVX). A $100,000 grant from the Ford Foundation made it possible from KUED to sign on the air.

Early programming was purely educational, in some cases consisting of nothing more than a teacher standing in front of a chalk board and lecturing. About half of the programs aired were locally produced, with the rest coming from National Educational Television (NET) and other sources. When PBS succeeded NET in 1970, the focus of programming changed to educational and entertainment programming.

For most of the time from 1965 to 1988, KUED was the default NET/PBS member station for most of Montana; cable systems in most of the state from Butte eastward piped in KUED. When KUSM signed on from Bozeman as the first public television station in Montana, it simulcast KUED for PBS programming for its first three years on the air as part of a partnership between the U of U and KUSM's owner, Montana State University. This gave KUSM time to train its staff and build local support. In 1988, TCI Cable, which by then had become the dominant cable provider in most of Montana, began phasing out KUED, with KUSM completely replacing KUED across TCI's footprint by 1990.

After having branded with its call letters and channel number for virtually its entire history, KUED announced on November 4, 2019 that it would rebrand as "PBS Utah" on November 25, adopting the updated national PBS logo and branding that was unveiled the same day.

Technical information

Subchannels
The station's digital signal is multiplexed:

On March 7, 2017, KUED replaced V-me on digital 7.3 with PBS Kids.

On December 29, 2017, KUED added Create on digital subchannel 7.4.

Analog-to-digital conversion
KUED shut down its analog signal, over VHF channel 7, on June 12, 2009, as part of the federally mandated transition from analog to digital television. The station's digital signal remained on its pre-transition UHF channel 42, using PSIP to display KUED's virtual channel as 7 on digital television receivers.

Satellite stations and translators
KUED has two full power satellites serving rural areas of Utah, both digital-only:

Notes:
1. KUES used the callsign KAVT during its construction permit from September 15 to November 3, 1997.

Aside from their transmitters, KUES and KUEW do not maintain any physical presence in their cities of license.

Additionally, KUED can be seen on over 85 translator stations covering all of Utah, plus parts of Arizona, Idaho, Nevada and Wyoming.

Related stations
KUEN (also known as UEN-TV)
KUER

References

External links 

University of Utah
UED
PBS member stations
Television channels and stations established in 1958
Mass media in Salt Lake City
1958 establishments in Utah